The 1938–39 season was the 54th season in Liverpool F.C.'s existence, and the club ended the season in 11th place. Liverpool reached the fifth round of the FA Cup but were knocked out by Wolverhampton Wanderers.

Goalkeepers

 Arthur Riley
 Dirk Kemp

Defenders

 Matt Busby
 Jimmy McInnes
 Tom Cooper
 Jim Harley
 Fred Rodgers
 Tom Bush
 Bernard Ramsden
 Ron Jones
 John Browning
 Matthew Fitzsimmons
 Keith Peters
 John Easdale

Midfielders

 Berry Nieuwenhuys
 Bill Kinghorn
 Harman van den Berg
 Harry Eastham
 George Paterson

Forwards

 Jack Balmer
 Phil Taylor
 Willie Fagan
 John Shafto

Table

Results

these were the results of Liverpool's matches in the 1938-39 season.

First division

FA Cup

References
 LFC History.net – 1938–39 season

Liverpool F.C. seasons
Liverpool